Albert Allen (1867–1899) was an English footballer.

Albert Allen may also refer to:

Albert Arthur Allen (1886–1962), American photographer
Albert Robert Allen (1916–1992), known as Bob Allen, English footballer
Bert Allen (Australian footballer), Albert Victor Edward 'Bert' Allen (1887–1975), Australian rules football player and umpire
Jack Allen (footballer, born 1891), Albert John Allen (1891–1971), English footballer

See also
Bert Allen (disambiguation)

Allen (surmame)